The Hertfordshire Cricket League is a league cricket competition based in the county of Hertfordshire, England. Since 2015 it has been a designated ECB Premier League, the highest level of recreational club cricket in England and Wales.

History
League cricket in Hertfordshire began in 1968 with the forming of the Hertfordshire Cricket Competition. In 1974 the leading clubs broke away from the Competition and formed the Hertfordshire Cricket League, and then in 1994 the two tournaments once again merged under the name Hertfordshire Cricket League.

When the system of ECB Premier Leagues was introduced, it was decided that the Hertfordshire Cricket League together with the Cherwell Cricket League and Thames Valley Cricket League should become feeders to a newly formed Home Counties Premier Cricket League. Accordingly, between 2000 and 2013 the top Hertfordshire clubs played in that league and not in the Hertfordshire Cricket League.

Hertfordshire's relationship with the Home Counties Premier Cricket League was always uneasy, and in autumn 2013 the Hertfordshire clubs all resigned from the Home Counties Premier Cricket League (with the exception of Tring Park, who had not played in the Hertfordshire Cricket League since 1981, when they switched to the Thames Valley Cricket League). The Hertfordshire clubs then returned to the Hertfordshire Cricket League, which was awarded ECB Premier League status in time for the 2015 season. In a format which was unique among the ECB Premier Leagues until it was also adopted by Lincolnshire in 2019, the championship is not decided on league performance alone; the top four in the league table then play semi-finals and a final to decide the champions.

Although most of the league's member clubs are located within the borders of the county, teams from North London and Bedfordshire are also members, and in the past there have been member clubs from Buckinghamshire and Essex as well. The league is sponsored by Saracens Rugby Football Club.

The clubs competing in the Premier Division in 2020 were due to be: Harpenden, Hertford, Hoddesdon, North Mymms, Potters Bar, Radlett, Reed, Totteridge Millhillians, Welwyn Garden City, and West Herts.  The 2020 competition was cancelled because of the COVID-19 pandemic. A replacement competition was organised for the later part of the season when cricket again became possible, but with the winners not to be regarded as official league champions.

Winners

Hertfordshire Cricket Competition 1968 to 1973

Hertfordshire Cricket League 1974 to 1999
 

 

Between 2000 and 2013 the leading Hertfordshire clubs played in the Home Counties Premier Cricket League.

Hertfordshire Cricket League from 2014
 

Source:

Performance by season from 2015

References

External links
 Official website
 play-cricket website

English domestic cricket competitions
Cricket in Hertfordshire
ECB Premier Leagues